Gilgit Baltistan is an administrative territory of Pakistan that borders the province of Khyber Pakhtunkhwa to the west, Azad Kashmir to the southwest, Wakhan Corridor of Afghanistan to the northwest, the Xinjiang Uyghur Autonomous Region of China to the north, and the Indian administrated region of Jammu and Kashmir to the south and southeast.

The early recorded history of the region is linked with Western Tibet.  The region appears to be part of the Tibetan Empire, with Buddhism flourishing in the region by 5th century. Later, Buddhist Patola Shahis ruled the region. However, by the 13th century, the region came under Islamic influence, notably under Maqpon Kings. This resulted in the separation of the Balti people from the Buddhist Ladakhi neighbors. The Baltis increasingly converted from Buddhism to  Islam, resulting in increased interaction and conflict with their Kashmiri Muslim neighbours. Muslim rule in the area ended with the expansion of the Sikh Empire. After the British defeat of the Sikhs in the  Anglo-Sikh wars, the region was ruled by the Hindu Dogras under British paramountcy. After independence, the region became part of the newly formed state of Pakistan through Gilgit rebellion in first Kashmir war.

Sources

Ancient History 
There exists no written record of the region; however, rock art (petroglyphs) and inscriptions are abundant esp. along the Karakoram Highway which have been used to reconstruct a rough history.

Medieval History 
No extant manuscripts pertaining to the history of the region from premodern times have been located. 

Ḥashmatullah Khan's Mukhtaṣar Tarikh-e Jammun va Kashmir (1939) and Rajah Shah Rais Khan's Tarikh-e-Gilgit (unpublished manuscript; 1941) remain the chief sources. H. Khan was a Dogra official, who oversaw the administration of Gilgit-Baltistan and drafted a gazetteer of the entire region, borrowing from official documents, local clerics, epic literature, oral folklore, ruins, etc. Notwithstanding the briefness, his chronologies are internally inconsistent and Dani advises caution in using the material. Despite, it has become an authoritative reference for local historians. Rais Khan was a descendant of the Trakhan family and compiled what was essentially a family history. Dani found it to be heavily biased towards the Trakhans and severely contemptuous of neighboring powers.

Early History
There are more than 50,000 pieces of rock art (petroglyphs) and inscriptions all along the Karakoram Highway in Gilgit Baltistan, concentrated at ten major sites between Hunza Nagar and Shatial. The carvings were left by various invaders, traders, and pilgrims who passed along the trade route, as well as by locals. The earliest date back to between 5000 and 1000 BCE, showing single animals, triangular men and hunting scenes in which the animals are larger than the hunters. These carvings were pecked into the rock with stone tools and are covered with a thick patina that proves their age.

The ethnologist Karl Jettmar has pieced together the history of the area from various inscriptions and recorded his findings in Rock Carvings and Inscriptions in the Northern Areas of Pakistan and the later released Between Gandhara and the Silk Roads - Rock Carvings Along the Karakoram Highway.

The rock carvings found in various places in Gilgit-Baltistan, especially those found in the Passu village of hunza Nagar, suggest a human presence since 2000 BC. It is believed that the Burusho people were the indigenous of the region and were pushed higher into the mountains by the movements of the Indo-Aryans, who traveled southward sometime around 1800 B.C." Within the next few centuries of human settlement on the Tibetan plateau, this region became inhabited by Tibetans, who preceded the Balti people of Baltistan. Today Baltistan bears similarity to Ladakh physically and culturally (although not in religion). Dards are found mainly in the western areas. These people are the Shina-speaking peoples of Gilgit, Chilas, Astore and Diamir, while in Hunza Nagar and the upper regions, Burushaski and Khowar speakers predominate. The Dards find mention in the works of Herodotus, Nearchus, Megasthenes, Pliny, Ptolemy, and the geographical lists of the Puranas. In the 1st century, the people of these regions were followers of the Bon religion while in the 2nd century, they followed Buddhism.

Medieval history

Patola Shahis

Between 399 and 414, the Chinese Buddhist pilgrim Faxian visited Gilgit-Baltistan, while in the 6th century Somana Patola (greater Gilgit-Chilas) was ruled by an unknown king. Between 627 and 645, the Chinese Buddhist pilgrim Xuanzang travelled through this region on his pilgrimage to India.

According to Chinese records from the Tang dynasty, between the 600s and the 700s, the region was governed by a Buddhist dynasty referred to as Bolü, also transliterated as Palola, Patola, Balur. They are believed to be the Patola Sāhi dynasty mentioned in a Brahmi inscription, and are devout adherents of Vajrayana Buddhism. At the time, Little Palola was used to refer to Gilgit, while Great Palola was used to refer to Baltistan. However, the records do not consistently disambiguate the two.

In mid-600s, Gilgit came under Chinese suzerainty after the fall of Western Turkic Khaganate due to Tang military campaigns in the region. In the late 600s CE, the rising Tibetan Empire wrestled control of the region from the Chinese. However, faced with growing influence of the Umayyad Caliphate and then the Abbasid Caliphate to the west, the Tibetans were forced to ally themselves with the Islamic caliphates. The region was then contested by Chinese and Tibetan forces, and their respective vassal states, until the mid-700s. Rulers of Gilgit formed an alliance with the Tang Chinese and held back the Arabs with their help.

Between 644 and 655, Navasurendrāditya-nandin became king of Palola Sāhi dynasty in Gilgit. Numerous Sanskrit inscriptions, including the Danyor Rock Inscriptions, were discovered to be from his reign. In the late 600s and early 700s, Jayamaṅgalavikramāditya-nandin was king of Gilgit.

According to Chinese court records, in 717 and 719 respectively, delegations of a ruler of Great Palola (Baltistan) named Su-fu-she-li-ji-li-ni reached the Chinese imperial court. By at least 719/720, Ladakh (Mard) became part of the Tibetan Empire. By that time, Buddhism was practiced in Baltistan, and Sanskrit was the written language. Buddhism became firmly established in the region. Great monasteries were established, with education in Sanskrit language regarding Indian religions and philosophy. Trade expanded between Ladakh in India and Gilgit-Baltistan. The rulers of Leh in Ladakh, India became increasingly influential in Balti culture and customs, and the chiefs of the region became vassals to the Ladakhis and Tibetan paramountcy.

In 720, the delegation of Surendrāditya reached the Chinese imperial court. He was referred to by the Chinese records as the king of Great Palola; however, it is unknown if Baltistan was under Gilgit rule at the time. The Chinese emperor also granted the ruler of Cashmere, Chandrāpīḍa ("Tchen-fo-lo-pi-li"), the title of "King of Cashmere". By 721/722, Baltistan had come under the influence of the Tibetan Empire.

In 721–722, Tibetan army attempted but failed to capture Gilgit or Bruzha (Yasin valley). By this time, according to Chinese records, the king of Little Palola was Mo-ching-mang. He had visited Tang court requesting military assistance against the Tibetans. Between 723 and 728, the Korean Buddhist pilgrim Hyecho passed through this area. In 737/738, Tibetan troops under the leadership of Minister Bel Kyesang Dongtsab of Emperor Me Agtsom took control of Little Palola. By 747, the Chinese army under the leadership of the ethnic-Korean commander Gao Xianzhi had recaptured Little Palola. Great Palola was subsequently captured by the Chinese army in 753 under the military Governor Feng Changqing. However, by 755, due to the An Lushan rebellion, the Tang Chinese forces withdrew and was no longer able to exert influence in Central Asia and in the regions around Gilgit-Baltistan. The control of the region was left to the Tibetan Empire. They referred to the region as Bruzha, a toponym that is consistent with the ethnonym "Burusho" used today. Tibetan control of the region lasted until late-800s CE.

Trakhan Dynasty
Ahmad Hasan Dani notes local tradition to mention of a Trakhan Dynasty succeeding to the Patola Shahis, and ruling uninterruptedly until the 19th century for over a millennia. He put forward a tentative reconstruction of the dynasty, deriving from H. Khan and Rais Khan's histories of the region. Historical evidence—coins, inscriptions etc.—corroborating the narrative was absent during Dani's time and those which have been since discovered, reject the presence of any such dynasty.

List of Trakhan rulers

Maqpon Dynasty

In the 14th century, Sufi Muslim preachers from Persia and Central Asia introduced Islam in Baltistan. Famous amongst them was Mir Sayyid Ali Hamadani who came via Kashmir while in the Gilgit region Islam entered in the same century through Turkic Tarkhan rulers. Gilgit-Baltistan was ruled by many local rulers, amongst whom the Maqpon dynasty of Skardu and the Rajas of Hunza were famous. The Maqpons of Skardu unified Gilgit-Baltistan with Chitral and Ladakh, especially in the era of Ali Sher Khan Anchan who had friendly relations with the Mughal court. Anchan reign brought prosperity and entertained art, sport, and variety in architecture. He introduced polo to the Gilgit region and from Chitral, he sent a group of musicians to Delhi to learn Indian music; the Mughal architecture influenced the architecture of the region as well. Later Anchan in his successors Abdal Khan had great influence though in the popular literature of Baltistan he is still alive as a dark figure by the nickname "Mizos" "man-eater". The last Maqpons Raja, Ahmed Shah, ruled all of Baltistan between 1811 and 1840. The areas of Gilgit, Chitral and Hunza had already become independent of the Maqpons.

Hunza State
Hunza was a principality established in 1200s. It later became a princely state in a subsidiary alliance with British India from 1892 to August 1947, for three months was unaligned, and then from November 1947 until 1974 was a princely state of Pakistan.

Nagar State
Nagar was another princely salute state in the northern part of Gilgit–Baltistan, Pakistan. Established in 14th century, it was in a subsidiary alliance with British India until August 1947.

Modern history

Princely State of Kashmir
It took a long time for the Maharajahs Ghulab Singh and Ranbir Singh to extend their writ over Gilgit, Hunza and Nagar, and not until 1870 did they assert their authority over Gilgit town. The grip of the Jammu and Kashmir government over this area was tenuous. One of the first British officials to visit the region was G. T. Vinge. The region was practically independent of British influence. However, Vinge secured the confidence of the local duke of Baltistan, and received valuable antiquity and manuscripts during his mission.

The Indian government undertook administrative reforms in 1885 and created Gilgit Agency in 1889 as a way for the British to secure the region as a buffer from the Russians. As a result of this Great Game, with British fear of Russian activities in Chinese Sinkiang increasing, in 1935 the Gilgit Agency was expanded by the Maharajah Hari Singh leasing the Gilgit Wazarat to the government of India for a period of sixty years and for an amount of 75,000Rs. This gave the British political agent complete control of defence, communications and foreign relations while the Kashmiri state retained civil administration and the British retained control of defence and foreign affairs.

After World War II British influence started declining. British despite decline in its rule, handled the situation cleverly and gave two options to the states in British Raj under their rule to join any of the two emerging states, India and Pakistan. In 1947, Mountbatten decided to terminate the lease of Gilgit by Kashmir to the British. Scholar Yaqoob Khan Bangash opines that the motive for this is unclear.

The people of Gilgit thought themselves to be ethnically different from the Kashmiris and resented being under Kashmir state rule. Gilgit was also one of the most backward areas of the Kashmir state. Major William Brown, the Maharaja's commander of the Gilgit Scouts, believed that the British handover of Gilgit to Kashmir was a huge mistake. Brown recounts that when he met the scouts ''they indirectly made it clear how they despised and hated Kashmir and everything connected with it, how happy and content they had been under the British rule, and how they considered they had been betrayed by the British in the unconditional handing over of their country to Kashmir''. Taking advantage of the situation the populace of Gilgit-Baltistan started revolting, the people of Ghizer were first to raise the flag of revolution, and gradually the masses of entire region stood up against the rule of Maharaja, again British played an important role in war of independence of Gilgit-Baltistan.

End of the princely state
On 26 October 1947, Maharaja Hari Singh of Jammu and Kashmir, faced with an invasion from tribal fighters coming from Pakistan due to 1947 Jammu Massacre along with 1947 Poonch rebellion, signed the Instrument of Accession, joining India. Gilgit's population did not favour the State's accession to India. According to Muzzaffar Bangash, the Raja orderly in Chilas, represented the views of the region's people when he said: The whole of Gilgit Agency is pro-Pakistan ... we could never swear allegiance to Hindustan. Apart from religion, the Gilgit Agency is really a part of the NWFP and is therefore a part of Pakistan. If Kashmir remains independent, well and good .... But if the Maharaja through pig headedness and bad advice, political pressure or attractive remunerations accedes to Hindustan, then there will be trouble here!

The local populace of Gilgit supported the tribal fighters as they were eager to force the Dogras rule out of Gilgit-Baltistan. According to Scholar Yaqoob Khan Bangash:

"By the middle of 1947 news of communal tensions had reached Gilgit and in a place where Hindu Dogras were despised for their heavy-handedness during the conflicts to subdue Gilgit, stories of Muslims being slaughtered by Hindus and Sikhs in the Punjab inflamed passions against the small minorities of Hindus and Sikhs in Gilgit."

Major Brown was well aware of the anti-maharaja sentiments among the people in Gilgit. Sensing their discontent, Brown mutinied on 1 November 1947, overthrowing the Governor Ghansara Singh. The bloodless coup d'etat was planned by Brown to the last detail under the code name Datta Khel. Major Brown is also credited to have saved Hindu population in Gilgit from being harmed. Major Brown acted to prevent bloodshed and took some personal risk in doing so.

On the morning of 2 November 1947, after the Pakistan flag had been raised in scout lines, a provisional government (Aburi Hakoomat) was established with Shah Rais Khan as president, Mirza Hassan khan as commander in chief and Major Brown as the chief military advisor. However, Major Brown had already telegraphed Khan Abdul Qayyum Khan asking Pakistan to take over. The Pakistani political agent, Khan Mohammad Alam Khan, arrived on 16 November and took over the administration of Gilgit. On 18 November 1947, the provisional government requested to see the political agent asserting that he should take all decisions in consultation with them.  They demanded that both British officers be relieved of their duties and they should be appointed in their place. According to Brown,

The provisional government lasted 16 days. The provisional government lacked sway over the population. The Gilgit rebellion did not have civilian involvement and was solely the work of military leaders, not all of whom had been in favor of joining Pakistan, at least in the short term. Dani mentions that although there was lack of public participation in the rebellion, pro-Pakistan sentiments were intense in the civilian population and their anti-Kashmiri sentiments were also clear. Scholar Yaqoob Khan Bangash states that the people of Gilgit as well as those of Chilas, Koh Ghizr, Ishkoman, Yasin, Punial, Hunza and Nagar joined Pakistan by choice.

After taking control of Gilgit, the Gilgit Scouts (a paramilitary force comprising trained Muslim locals but commanded by British officers) along with Azad irregulars moved towards Baltistan and Ladakh and captured Skardu by May 1948. They successfully blocked the Indian reinforcements and subsequently captured Dras and Kargill as well, cutting off the Indian communications to Leh in Ladakh. The Indian forces mounted an offensive in Autumn 1948 and recaptured all of Kargil district. Baltistan region, however, came under Gilgit control.

On 1 January 1948, India took the issue of Jammu and Kashmir to the United Nations Security Council. In April 1948, the Council passed a resolution calling for Pakistan to withdraw from all of Jammu and Kashmir and then India was to reduce its forces to the minimum level, following which a plebiscite would be held to ascertain the people's wishes. However, no withdrawal was ever carried out, India insisting that Pakistan had to withdraw first and Pakistan contending that there was no guarantee that India would withdraw afterwards. Gilgit-Baltistan and a western portion of the state called Azad Jammu and Kashmir) have remained under the control of Pakistan since then. Sudheendra Kulkarni, who served as an aide to India's former Prime Minister Atal Bihari Vajpayee, states that in all the discussions held by Indian leadership including Vallabhbhai Patel regarding plebiscite in Jammu and Kashmir, hardly ever talked about holding plebiscite in Gilgit Baltistan.

The decision of Gilgit to join Pakistan on November 2, along with the accession by the Mirs of Hunza and Nagar to Pakistan the following day was not challenged by any Indian leaders like Vallabhbhai Patel or Jawaharlal Nehru. V. P. Menon in his book states that 'accession of Gilgit to India would have provoked adverse reactions in Gilgit and certain areas contiguous to Pakistan.' Narendra Singh Sarila, former aide de camp to Lord Louis Mountbatten and former ambassador to France, states in his book that "Lord Mountbatten was eager to have the Kashmir dispute resolved before he resigned from the governor-generalship in June 1948. At his request, V. P. Menon and Sir N. Gopalaswami Ayyangar, drew up a plan for partition of the state, complete with maps (which left Gilgit to Pakistan). On 23 July 1948, V.P. Menon told the chargé d'affaires of the US embassy in Delhi that the Indian government will accept settlement based on accession of Mirpur, Poonch, Muzaffarabad and Gilgit to Pakistan."

Part of Pakistan
1947 to 1970 Government of Pakistan established Gilgit Agency and Baltistan Agency. In 1970 Northern areas council established by Zulfiqar Ali Bhutto and Gilgit Baltistan was directly administrated by federal government and it was called FANA(Federally Administered Northern Areas). In 1963, Pakistan gave up claim on a part of Hunza-Gilgit called Raskam and the Shaksgam Valley of Baltistan region,which resulted in Pak China border agreement 1963, pending settlement of the dispute over Kashmir. This area is also known as the Trans-Karakoram Tract. The Pakistani parts of Kashmir to the north and west of the cease-fire line established at the end of the Indo-Pakistani War of 1947, or the Line of Control as it later came to be called, were divided into the Northern Areas (72,971 km2) in the north and the Pakistani state of Azad Kashmir (13,297 km2) in the south. The name "Northern Areas" was first used by the United Nations to refer to the northern areas of Kashmir.

The local Northern Light Infantry is the army unit that participated in the 1999 Kargil conflict. More than 500 soldiers were believed to have been killed and buried in the Northern Areas in that action. Lalak Jan, a soldier from Yasin Valley, was awarded Pakistan's most prestigious medal, the Nishan-e-Haider, for his courageous actions during the Kargil conflict.

Self-governing status and present-day Gilgit Baltistan
On 29 August 2009, the Gilgit Baltistan Empowerment and Self-Governance Order, 2009, was passed by the Pakistani cabinet and later signed by the President of Pakistan. The order granted self-rule to the people of the former Northern Areas, now renamed Gilgit Baltistan, by creating, among other things, an elected legislative assembly.

There has been an uplift in the self-identification of this territory's inhabitants through the name change but it has still left the region's constitutional status within Pakistan undefined. People of Gilgit-Baltistan have Pakistani passports and identity cards, yet are not represented in the Parliament of Pakistan. Similarly, Gilgit-Baltistan is a member of neither the cCI nor the NFC constitutional bodies.

However, the Supreme Court of Pakistan has time and again asked for determination of the constitutional status of Gilgit-Baltistan. In this regard the 1999 Supreme Court judgement is a landmark decision, declaring people of Northern Areas as Pakistani citizens with all fundamental rights. A seven-member bench of the Supreme Court of Pakistan was told in November 2018 that the Federal Government has had appointed a high-level committee to examine the constitutional reforms of Gilgit-Baltistan.
According to Antia Mato Bouzas, the 2009 Governance Order was the Pakistani government's compromise between its official stand on Kashmir and the demands of a territory where the majority of people may have pro-Pakistan sentiments.

There has been some criticism and opposition to this move in India and Gilgit Baltistan region of Pakistan.

Gilgit Baltistan United Movement while rejecting the new package demanded that an independent and autonomous legislative assembly for Gilgit Baltistan should be formed with the installation of local authoritative government as per the UNCIP resolutions, where the people of Gilgit Baltistan will elect their president and the prime minister.

In early September 2009, Pakistan signed an agreement with the People's Republic of China for a mega energy project in Gilgit–Baltistan which includes the construction of a 7,000-megawatt dam at Bunji in the Astore District. This also resulted in protest from India, although Indian concerns were immediately rejected by Pakistan, which claimed that the Government of India has no locus standi in the matter, effectively ignoring the validity of the princely state's Instrument of Accession on October 26, 1947.

On 29 September 2009, the Prime Minister, while addressing a huge gathering in Gilgit–Baltistan, announced a multi-billion rupee development package aimed at the socio-economic uplifting of people in the area. Development projects will include the areas of education, health, agriculture, tourism and the basic needs of life.

Notes

References
 Footnotes

 Sources
 
 Antia Mato Bouzas (2012) Mixed Legacies in Contested Borderlands: Skardu and the Kashmir Dispute, Geopolitics, 17:4, 867–886, DOI: 10.1080/14650045.2012.660577
 Citations

External links
 Britannica Gilgit
 Britannica Baltistan 
 Gilgit-Baltistan autonomy order